Allium candargyi is a plant species endemic to Greece, known only from the Island of Lesbos (Λέσβος) in the Aegean Sea.

Allium candargyi is a perennial bulb-forming herb producing an umbel of flowers.

References

candargyi
Flora of Greece
Onions
Lesbos
Plants described in 1994